Louisiana Highway 646 (LA 646) was a state highway that served Lafourche Parish.  It spanned a total of  along French Plantation Road and Little Choupic Road west of Thibodaux, near the Lafourche-Assumption parish line.

Route description
From the southeast, LA 646 began at an intersection with LA 308 west of Thibodaux and an area known as Laurel Grove.  It proceeded northeast along French Plantation Road then turned in a general westerly direction to zigzag along Little Choupic Road to its terminus at the Assumption Parish line.

LA 646 was an undivided, two-lane highway for its entire length.

History
LA 646 was designated as State Route C-1338 prior to the 1955 Louisiana Highway renumbering.

Major intersections

References

External links

La DOTD State, District, and Parish Maps
District 02
Lafourche Parish (Northwest Section)

0646
Transportation in Lafourche Parish, Louisiana